Erik Lindblom  (1857-1928) was a Swedish-American gold prospector. He  was one of the "Three Lucky Swedes" who founded and developed the Nome mining district.

Biography
Erik Olof Lindblom was born June 27, 1857  in Härjedalen, Sweden, the son of Olof Lindblom and Brita (née Olofsson). Lindblom's father was a land owner and school master in Sweden. Born and raised in an iron and copper region, he had a fundamental knowledge of mining. Lindblom left Sweden at the age of seventeen. He came to the United States in 1886 and engaged in mining in Colorado, Idaho and Montana. Lindblom was naturalized as a United States citizen in 1894.

In 1898, Lindblom went to Alaska where he met John Brynteson (1871-1959) and Jafet Lindeberg (1874-1962). Late that winter they uncovered the first gold found in the Nome mining district, and founded the extensive mining interests there which would produce a large fortune.

Lindblom invested the proceeds from his mining fortune in banks, transportation, and real estate. He would become president of the Swedish-American Bank of San Francisco and vice-president of the Pioneer Mining and Ditch Company of Nome, Alaska. 

Lindblom was appointed Swedish Commissioner to the 1915 Panama-Pacific International Exposition by King Gustaf V of Sweden and later was knighted by that monarch, being presented with the Royal Order of Vasa of the first degree.

Lindblom invested in the Claremont Resort in Oakland, California, which was completed in 1915. Three years later, he took complete possession of the hotel. Lindblom died in 1928 at his residence at the Claremont Hotel.

Personal life
He was first married to Mary Anne Smith in London in August 1886 and had a son and a daughter. They were divorced in 1907. Lindblom subsequently married  Hannah Ulrika Sadie Sparman in June 1907.They had one son.

Legacy
A statue of Erik Lindblom, together with Jafet Lindeberg and John Brynteson, stands in Nome, Alaska.
Jafet Lindeberg, Erik Lindblom and John Brynteson are all listed in the Alaskan Mining Hall of Fame.
Lindblom Creek, Nome, is named after him.

See also--
Nome Gold Rush

References

Primary sources
 Harrison, Edward Sanford  (1905) Nome and Seward Peninsula: a book of information about northwestern Alaska  (E.S. Harrison)
 Carlson, Leland H. (1948)  Swedish Pioneers & the Discovery of Gold in Alaska (American Swedish Historical Museum)

External links
Eric Lindblom, one of Nome's "Three Lucky Swedes
Three Lucky Swedes”, discoverers of the Nome Gold Fields in 1898
Pioneer Mining and Ditch Company
John A. Marshall-Erik O. Lindblom House
Claremont Hotel Official Website

Gold prospectors
American gold prospectors
Swedish emigrants to the United States
1857 births
1928 deaths
Grand Crosses of the Order of Vasa
People from Härjedalen
People from Nome, Alaska
19th-century American people
20th-century American people
19th-century Swedish people